The black-throated magpie-jay (Calocitta colliei) is a strikingly long-tailed magpie-jay of northwestern Mexico.

Taxonomy
The black-throated magpie-jay was formally described in 1829 by the Irish zoologist Nicholas Aylward Vigors from a specimen collected at San Blas, Nayarit, Mexico. The specimen had been obtained by members of an expedition to explore the western coast of North America captained by Frederick William Beechey on HMS Blossom. Vigors coined the binomial name Pica colleriei, with the specific epithet chosen to  honour Alexander Collie, the surgeon onboard the Blossom, who had presented the specimen to the Zoological Society of London. The black-throated magpie-jay is now one of two species placed in the genus Calocitta that was introduced in 1841 by the English zoologist George Robert Gray. The species is monotypic: no subspecies are recognised.

Description
This species is 58.5 to 76.5 cm (23 to 30 inches) long, more than half of which is the tail, and weight is 225-251 grams (8-9 oz.). Only a very few corvids, including the black-billed magpie, the red-billed blue magpie and the closely related white-throated magpie-jay, have a comparable tail length. The upperparts are blue with white tips to the tail feathers; the underparts are white.  The bill, legs, head, and conspicuous crest are black except for a pale blue crescent over the eyes and a patch under the eye.  In juveniles, the crest has a white tip and the patch below the eye is smaller and darker blue than in adults.  In most birds, the throat and chest are also black, but some in the southern part of the range have various amounts of white there.

The calls are varied, loud, raucous, sometimes parrot-like.

Distribution and habitat
This species occurs in pairs or small groups in woodland, except for humid woodland, and partially open areas on the Pacific Slope of Mexico from southern Sonora south to Jalisco and northwestern Colima, for a total of 160,000 km2. As of 1993 there was some evidence of a population decline.

The species has become established in southern San Diego County (2013), especially in the Tijuana River Valley. The birds are presumably descendants of escapees from nearby Tijuana, Baja California, where the trade in birds is unregulated.

Behavior
The diet is the omnivorous one typical of the crow family.

The nest is also typical of the family: a big cup of sticks lined with softer material.  The female lays 3 to 7 whitish eggs with brown and gray spots.

This species interbreeds with the white-throated magpie-jay in Jalisco and Colima, where intermediate birds are common.  It has been considered a subspecies of the white-throated magpie-jay, Calocitta formosa colliei.

References

External links
Bird-stamps.org: Stamps of Mexico with species range maps
VIREO.org: "Black-throated magpie-jay" 
Photo-High Res--(Close-up); Whozoo.org: Black-throated magpie-jay article + high resolution photo.

black-throated magpie-jay
Endemic birds of Western Mexico
Birds of the Sierra Madre Occidental
Birds of the Trans-Mexican Volcanic Belt
Natural history of the Mexican Plateau
Natural history of Sinaloa
Natural history of Sonora
black-throated magpie-jay
Taxobox binomials not recognized by IUCN